Barrow is an English surname. Notable people with the surname include:

 Adama Barrow (born 1965), Gambian President
 Al Barrow (born 1968), English musician
 Anibal Barrow (1948–2013), Honduran journalist
 Bernard Barrow (1927–1993), American actor
 Claire Barrow, English artist
 Clyde Barrow (1909–1934), American gangster, part of the Bonnie and Clyde crime duo
 Dean Barrow (born 1951), Belizean politician
 Ed Barrow (1868–1953), baseball executive
 Errol Barrow (1920–1987), Barbados politician
 Frances Elizabeth Barrow (1822–1894), American children's writer
 Geoff Barrow (born 1971), English musician
 Geoffrey Wallis Steuart Barrow (1924–2013), Scottish historian 
 George Barrow (geologist) (1853–1932), British geologist
 George Barrow (musician) (1921–2013), American jazz saxophonist
 George L. Barrow (1851–1925), Australian journalist, son of John H. Barrow
 Henry Barrowe (c. 1550–1593), 16th-century English Puritan and separatist
 Irvine Barrow (1913–2005), Canadian politician
 Isaac Barrow (1630–1677), English divine, scholar and mathematician
 Isaac Barrow (bishop) (1613–1680), Bishop of Sodor and Man and of St Asaph; Governor of the Isle of Man
 Jill Barrow (born 1951), British businesswoman
 Jocelyn Barrow (1929–2020), British educator, community activist and politician
 Sir John Barrow, 1st Baronet (1764–1848), English statesman
 John Barrow (U.S. politician) (born 1955), Representative for Georgia's 12th congressional district
 John D. Barrow (1952–2020), English theoretical physicist
 John Henry Barrow (1817–1874), Congregational minister, journalist and South Australian politician
 Joseph Louis Barrow (1914–1981), American boxer and heavyweight champion better known as "Joe Louis"
 Middleton P. Barrow (1839–1903), Senator from Georgia
 Modou Barrow (born 1992), Gambian professional footballer
 Moses Michael Levi Barrow (born Jamal Michael Barrow; 1978), better known by his stage name Shyne, Belizean rapper and politician
 Musa Barrow (born 1998), Gambian professional footballer
 Nita Barrow (1916–1995), Governor-General of Barbados
 Robert H. Barrow (1922–2008), American general, 27th Commandant of the US Marine Corps
 Robert Ruffin Barrow (1798-1875), American sugar planter and slave owner
 Rosemary Barrow (1968–2016), British art historian
 Steve Barrow (born 1945), reggae historian
 Timothy A. Barrow (1934–2019), American politician
 Tim Barrow (born 1964), British diplomat
 Thomas Barrow (Jesuit) (1747–1813), British Jesuit
 Thomas Barrow (politician) (1916–1982), politician in Manitoba, Canada
 Tony Barrow (1936–2016), English public relations man for The Beatles
 The Bravado Brothers, American professional wrestling tag team consisting of Clint Barrow (born 1989) and Houston Barrow (born 1985)

As an artist name:

 Typh Barrow (born 1987), Belgian singer-songwriter

See also
 Barrows (surname)

English-language surnames